Gerardo Diego Seoane Santalla (born 15 September 1976) is a Uruguayan former professional footballer played as a forward.

Career
Seoane began playing football with C.A. Bella Vista at age 17.

Seoane has had a journeyman's football career, playing abroad as a forward with A.D. Limonense of Costa Rica, Club Necaxa of Mexico, Sociedad Deportiva Aucas of Ecuador, Deportivo Táchira of Venezuela, Deportivo Pasto of Colombia, Grazer AK of Austria and C.D. Águila of El Salvador.

References

External links
 
 
 
https://web.archive.org/web/20110129225201/http://www.diegoseoane.com/site_ing/seoane/Personal%20Data.html

1976 births
Living people
Uruguayan footballers
Association football forwards
C.A. Bella Vista players
Club Necaxa footballers
El Tanque Sisley players
S.D. Aucas footballers
Deportivo Pasto footballers
FC Lustenau players
SC Austria Lustenau players
TSV Hartberg players
Wiener Sport-Club players
Grazer AK players
Racing Club de Montevideo players
C.D. Águila footballers
Beijing Sport University F.C. players
Categoría Primera A players
Liga MX players
China League One players
Uruguayan expatriate footballers
Uruguayan expatriate sportspeople in Mexico
Expatriate footballers in Mexico
Uruguayan expatriate sportspeople in Ecuador
Expatriate footballers in Ecuador
Uruguayan expatriate sportspeople in Colombia
Expatriate footballers in Colombia
Uruguayan expatriate sportspeople in Venezuela
Expatriate footballers in Venezuela
Uruguayan expatriate sportspeople in Austria
Expatriate footballers in Austria
Uruguayan expatriate sportspeople in Switzerland
Expatriate footballers in Switzerland
Uruguayan expatriate sportspeople in El Salvador
Expatriate footballers in El Salvador
Uruguayan expatriate sportspeople in China
Expatriate footballers in China